Joi may refer to:

People
 Jóhannes Ásbjörnsson (born 1979; nicknamed Jói), Icelandic TV and radio show host
 Joi (singer) (born 1971), American singer, songwriter, and record producer 
 "Joi", an AI character in Blade Runner 2049

Given name
 Joi Arcand (born 1982), nehiyaw photo-based artist
 Joi Barua, Indian singer and music composer
 Joi Cardwell (born 1967), American singer-songwriter, author, holistic health coach
 Joi Chua (born 1978), Singaporean female pop singer
 Joi Ito (born 1966), Japanese entrepreneur and venture capitalist
 Joi Lansing (1929–1972), American model, film and television actress, and nightclub singer
 Joi Srivastava (1930–2003), North Indian violinist of the Senia Gharana
 Joi Williams (born 1966), former head coach of the UCF Knights women's basketball team

Surname
 Marilyn Joi (born 1945), American actress

Other uses
 Joi (band), British alternative dub/dance music DJ team
 Joi (TV channel), an Italian Entertainment TV channel owned by Mediaset
 Joi Internet, a dial-up Internet service provider based in Atlanta, Georgia

See also
 JO1, a Japanese boy band formed through the reality competition show Produce 101 Japan
 Joy (disambiguation)